Brusnikin (from брусника meaning cowberry) is a Russian masculine surname, its feminine counterpart is Brusnikina. It may refer to
Anton Brusnikin (born 1986), Russian football player
Olga Brusnikina (born 1978), Russian synchronized swimmer

Russian-language surnames